The 2010 Women's Hockey World Cup was the 12th edition of the Women's Hockey World Cup field hockey tournament. It was held from 29 August to 11 September 2010 in Rosario, Argentina.

Argentina won the tournament for the second time after defeating defending champions the Netherlands 3–1 in the final. England won the third place match by defeating Germany 2–0 to claim their first ever World Cup medal.

Background
After Argentina was confirmed as host nation, it was decided to hold the tournament in Buenos Aires in a new stadium built in GEBA's grounds, but the club later refused to organize it due to economical difficulties. The second option had been the Jockey Club de Rosario, venue of the 2014 Champions Trophy, but the local government of Rosario decided instead to build a new stadium with a  capacity for 12,000 people with mobile grandstands in Fisherton, a neighbourhood located in the western part of the city.

Qualification
Each of the continental champions from five federations and the host nation received an automatic berth. The European and Asian federations received two and one extra quotas respectively based upon the FIH World Rankings at the completion of the 2008 Summer Olympics. In addition to the three winners of each of the three Qualifiers, the following twelve teams, shown with final pre-tournament rankings, competed in this tournament.

–Argentina qualified both as host and continental champion, therefore that quota was given to the European federation allowing Spain to qualify directly to the World Cup as the fourth placed team at the 2009 EuroHockey Nations Championship

Competition format
Twelve teams competed in the tournament with the competition consisting of two rounds. In the first round, teams were divided into two pools of six teams, and played in a round-robin format with each of the teams playing all other teams in the pool once. Teams were awarded three points for a win, one point for a draw and zero points for a loss. At the end of the pool matches, teams were ranked in their pool according to the following criteria in order:

Total points accumulated
Number of matches won
Goal difference
Goals for
The result of the match played between the teams in question

Following the completion of the pool games, teams placed first and second in each pool advanced to a single-elimination round consisting of two semifinal games, a third place play-off and a final. Remaining teams competed in classification matches to determine their ranking in the tournament. During these matches, extra time of 7½ minutes per half was played if teams were tied at the end of regulation time. During extra time, play followed golden goal rules with the first team to score declared the winner. If no goals were scored during extra time, a penalty stroke competition took place.

Squads

Umpires
Below are the 16 umpires appointed by the International Hockey Federation:

Claire Adenot (FRA)
Julie Ashton-Lucy (AUS)
Stella Bartlema (NED)
Frances Block (ENG)
Marelize de Klerk (RSA)
Carolina de la Fuente (ARG)
Elena Eskina (RUS)
Amy Hassick (USA)
Kelly Hudson (NZL)
Soledad Iparraguirre (ARG)
Michelle Joubert (RSA)
Carol Metchette (IRL)
Miao Lin (CHN)
Irene Presenqui (ARG)
Lisa Roach (AUS)
Wendy Stewart (CAN)

Results
All times are Argentina time (UTC−03:00)

First round

Pool A

Pool B

Fifth to twelfth place classification

Eleventh and twelfth place

Ninth and tenth place

Seventh and eighth place

Fifth and sixth place

First to fourth place classification

Semifinals

Third and fourth place

Final

Awards

Statistics

Final standings

Goalscorers

References

External links
Official FIH website

 
2010
2010 in women's field hockey
International women's field hockey competitions hosted by Argentina
Hockey
Sport in Rosario, Santa Fe
August 2010 sports events in South America
September 2010 sports events in South America